This is a list of museums in Somaliland.

Museums
National Museum of Somaliland
Hargeisa Provincial Museum
Saryan Museum

See also
List of museums

References

See also

External links
Museums in Somalia - National Museum in Mogadishu

 
Somaliland
Museums
Museums
Museums
Somaliland